Future Fighting Machines was a TV programme which examines the latest innovations in military hardware and military technology. It was produced by Tiger Aspect Productions.  It has been broadcast on The Discovery Channel, TechTV and UKTV History. Each episode ran for 30 minutes, and the show ran for two seasons. The programme shows the ambition of weapon developers worldwide to make soldiers less vulnerable and more lethal. The program also looks at new weapons that strike more accurately and unmanned vehicles run entirely by computers.  The programme made comparisons between rival weapon systems of different countries, showing advantages and disadvantages of weapons. There was also a profile of a different special forces unit in each episode.

List of episodes:

Camouflage technology

Virtual reality training for soldiers

The future of warfare

An American warship

Methods of destroying tanks

Unmanned underwater vehicles

America's latest amphibious assault vehicle

The Apache Longbow helicopter

The world's largest unmanned spy plane

The Joint Strike Fighter

Mine warfare technology

A new flying petrol station

The dangers of future urban combat

A portable missile launcher

A trimaran warship

A missile defence system

Amphibious landings and missiles

The LLP parachute

Britain's navy destroyers

Sub-machine guns

The world of the sniper

An electronic bullet system

The B1B Lancer

Military television series
Discovery Channel original programming
Television series by Tiger Aspect Productions
Television series by Endemol